Peel Street may refer to:
 
 Peel Street, Adelaide, Australia                                    
 Peel Street, Hong Kong
 Peel Street, Montreal, Canada